The Flatbush Avenue–Brooklyn College station (announced as Brooklyn College–Flatbush Avenue station on trains) is the southern terminal station on the IRT Nostrand Avenue Line of the New York City Subway. It is located at the intersection of Flatbush and Nostrand Avenues in Flatbush, Brooklyn, locally called "The Junction". The station is served by the 2 train at all times and the 5 train on weekdays. It is also the closest subway station to Brooklyn College and Midwood High School.

The Flatbush Avenue station was built along with the Nostrand Avenue Line as part of the Dual Contracts. The station opened on August 23, 1920, along with the rest of the line. Various proposals to extend the line past Flatbush Avenue were considered throughout the 20th century, but none were carried out.

The Flatbush Avenue–Brooklyn College station contains two side platforms and two tracks; the platforms are connected to each other at the southern end. It is the only such terminal station in the subway system, creating an inefficient design in which passengers must know which track a train is departing from before going to the platform. The platforms contain exits to the intersection of Nostrand and Flatbush Avenues, with a secondary exit to Avenue H. The station contains an elevator, which makes it compliant with the Americans with Disabilities Act of 1990.

History

The Dual Contracts, which were signed on March 19, 1913, were contracts for the construction and rehabilitation and operation of rapid transit lines in the City of New York. The Dual Contracts promised the construction of several lines in Brooklyn. As part of Contract 4, the IRT agreed to build a subway line along Nostrand Avenue in Brooklyn. The construction of the subway along Nostrand Avenue spurred real estate development in the surrounding areas. The Nostrand Avenue Line opened on August 23, 1920, and the Flatbush Avenue station opened as its terminal.

This underground station is the only "dead-end" terminal station in the subway system that does not have an island platform. It was built with two side platforms and two tracks to allow for a planned but ultimately unbuilt extension of the IRT Nostrand Avenue Line. The extension, proposed in 1929, would have brought the line south towards Voorhies Avenue in Sheepshead Bay. These plans were revisited in 1939, 1946, 1951, and 1968.

On October 5, 1931, a new staircase at the station to the southeastern corner of Flatbush Avenue and Nostrand Avenue was opened for service.

In 1968, as part of the Program for Action, the Metropolitan Transportation Authority (MTA) gave consideration to extending the IRT Nostrand Avenue Line approximately  beyond the station to provide room for turnaround facilities. This would eliminate the operational restrictions caused by the current layout. However, a ballot measure for funding much of the program was voted down in 1971, delaying this plan indefinitely. This plan was again considered in 1989.

In 1981, the MTA listed the station among the 69 most deteriorated stations in the subway system. Starting in December 1993, the station was renovated at the cost of $6 million. An elevator was installed, and the 1920s-style "Flatbush Avenue" name tablets, containing red backgrounds with blue borders, were restored on both platforms. The elevator was closed from July to December 2021. The top and bottom of the platform walls contain a blue solid line with a colorful border trim. This results in a tiling scheme with blue tiles that create a wavy pattern that comes farther up whenever there is a "F" tile — which stands for Flatbush — in the station's trimline.

In December 2020, the MTA announced that it would commission artwork in honor of subway operator Garrett Goble, who died on March 27, 2020, during an arson at the Central Park North–110th Street station. The Flatbush Avenue–Brooklyn College station was selected because Goble had used it often while growing up. The artwork was ultimately unveiled and installed on May 24, 2021.

Station layout

This station has two side platforms, which are connected at the south end just past the bumper blocks, forming a "U" shape. The presence of the connection at the southern end mitigates what is otherwise an inefficient terminal design, in which passengers must know which track a train is departing from before going to one of the two platforms.

The IRT Nostrand Avenue Line tunnels continue beyond the bumper blocks at Flatbush Avenue and Nostrand Avenue. They extend for several hundred feet to Avenue H, but no tracks were ever laid in these tunnels. Up until about 2006, passengers could see the cemented-over gratings extending down Nostrand Avenue. When a new building went up, the grates were removed. Prior to the construction of the exit at the south end of the station, there was only a temporary wooden ramp connecting the platforms and the tunnels were actually visible to passengers.

On weekdays when 5 trains serve the station, all Manhattan-bound 2 trains depart from Track 3, and all Manhattan-bound 5 trains depart from Track 2. When the 5 does not serve the station, 2 trains depart from both tracks.

The station platforms have several doors for various non-public uses, including crew quarters. A 2 train crew office is on the Track 3 side, and a 5 train crew office is on the Track 2 side. There are public restrooms along Track 3 just within the station's main entrance. The columns along the platforms are painted light-blue.

The 1996 cast bronze relief artwork at this station is called Flatbush Floogies by Muriel Castanis.

Exits
At the U-shaped end, there is an unstaffed exit containing two HEET turnstiles and one exit-only turnstile. The single staircase here goes up to the west side of Nostrand Avenue north of Avenue H. The station's main entrance is on the Track 3 (eastern) platform. Two street stairs from each eastern corner of Nostrand and Flatbush Avenues lead to where the full-time token booth and two separate banks of turnstiles are. The single elevator from street level down to fare control is at the southeast corner. There is another entrance on the platform of Track 2 (west side). This entrance has two sets of street stairs adjacent to each other at the northwest corner of Flatbush Avenue and Nostrand Avenue. The token booth and turnstile bank are open weekdays only. A single HEET turnstile provides access to this entrance other times.

References

External links

 
 nycsubway.org — Flatbush Floogies Artwork by Muriel Castanis (1996)
 MTA's Arts For Transit — Brooklyn College–Flatbush Avenue (IRT Nostrand Avenue Line)

IRT Nostrand Avenue Line stations
New York City Subway stations in Brooklyn
New York City Subway terminals
Railway stations in the United States opened in 1920
1920 establishments in New York City
Flatbush, Brooklyn
New York City Subway stations at university and college campuses